Henry Wyles Cushman (August 9, 1805 – November 21, 1863) was an American teacher, farmer, public house manager and politician who served both branches of the Massachusetts General Court and  as the 18th Lieutenant Governor for the Commonwealth of Massachusetts from 1851 to 1853.

Early life
Cushman was born to Polycarpus L. and Salley (Wyles) Cushman on August 9, 1805, in Bernardston, Massachusetts,

Public service
Cushman was a delegate to the Massachusetts Constitutional Convention of 1853. He was elected a member of the American Antiquarian Society in 1862.

References

1805 births
1863 deaths
People from Bernardston, Massachusetts
Deerfield Academy alumni
Lieutenant Governors of Massachusetts
Democratic Party members of the Massachusetts House of Representatives
Democratic Party Massachusetts state senators
School board members in Massachusetts
Members of the American Antiquarian Society
19th-century American politicians